The 1999 Goody's Body Pain 500 was the eighth stock car race of the 1999 NASCAR Winston Cup Series season and the 50th iteration of the event. The race was held on Sunday, April 18, 1999, before an audience of 60,000 in Martinsville, Virginia at Martinsville Speedway, a  permanent oval-shaped short track. The race took the scheduled 500 laps to complete. With three laps to go in the race, Petty Enterprises driver John Andretti would make a late-race move for the lead on Roush Racing driver Jeff Burton to take his second and final career NASCAR Winston Cup Series victory and his only win of the season. To fill out the podium, Jeff Burton and Hendrick Motorsports driver Jeff Gordon would finish second and third, respectively.

Background 

Martinsville Speedway is an NASCAR-owned stock car racing track located in Henry County, in Ridgeway, Virginia, just to the south of Martinsville. At 0.526 miles (0.847 km) in length, it is the shortest track in the NASCAR Cup Series. The track was also one of the first paved oval tracks in NASCAR, being built in 1947 by H. Clay Earles. It is also the only remaining race track that has been on the NASCAR circuit from its beginning in 1948.

Entry list 

 (R) denotes rookie driver.

Practice

First practice 
The first practice session was held on Friday, April 16, at 11:00 AM EST. The session would last for two hours and 30 minutes.

Second practice 
The second practice session was held on Saturday, April 17, at 10:00 AM EST. The session would last for one hour and 45 minutes.

Final practice 
The final practice session, sometimes referred to as Happy Hour, was held on Saturday, April 17, after the preliminary 1999 NAPA 250. The session would last for one hour.

Qualifying 
Qualifying was split into two rounds. The first round was held on Friday, April 16, at 3:00 PM EST. Each driver would have two laps to set a fastest time; the fastest of the two would count as their official qualifying lap. During the first round, the top 25 drivers in the round would be guaranteed a starting spot in the race. If a driver was not able to guarantee a spot in the first round, they had the option to scrub their time from the first round and try and run a faster lap time in a second round qualifying run, held on Saturday, April 17, at 12:30 PM EST. As with the first round, each driver would have two laps to set a fastest time; the fastest of the two would count as their official qualifying lap. Positions 26-36 would be decided on time, while positions 37-43 would be based on provisionals. Six spots are awarded by the use of provisionals based on owner's points. The seventh is awarded to a past champion who has not otherwise qualified for the race. If no past champion needs the provisional, the next team in the owner points will be awarded a provisional.

Three drivers would fail to qualify: Morgan Shepherd, Dave Marcis, and Buckshot Jones.

Full qualifying results

Race results

References 

1999 NASCAR Winston Cup Series
NASCAR races at Martinsville Speedway
April 1999 sports events in the United States
1999 in sports in Virginia